Onni Palaste, born Onni Bovellan (27 December 1917 - 1 July 2009) was a Finnish Winter War veteran and writer.

Onni Bovellan was born in Kiuruvesi, Finland on 27 December 1917 to parents Joona Bovellan and Olga Miina Kärkkäinen. He was a frail child and was not originally expected to live long. However, he survived and became healthy. After finishing school, Bovellan went to work in a sawmill.

In the Winter War, Bovellan fought in Colonel Hjalmar Siilasvuo's troops. He led many successful patrols to Soviet territory and was awarded the Iron Cross.

After the Winter War, Onni Bovellan changed his surname to Palaste. He worked as director of the Vuokatti sports academy and also met his wife Kerttu Klemetti.

Onni Palaste started writing factual, but slightly dramatised novels about the Winter War in 1967. His original inspiration to writing was winning a short story competition during the war, after which his fellow soldiers suggested he try writing full-length novels. He had written about twenty war novels, the latest of which was published in 2004. He has also written a three-novel mini-series about Simo Hurtta, a Swedish tax official during the 17th-18th century Greater Wrath.

Onni and Kerttu Palaste lived their elder years in Helsinki, Finland. Onni Palaste died on 1 July 2009 at the age of 91. He and his wife Kerttu are survived by their four children.

Bibliography
 Rukajärven sissit, 1967
 Minä, desantti, 1970
 Sissi rajan takaa, 1972
 Siviilisissit Stalinin kanavalla, 1973
 Simo Hurtta, 1978
 Suomussalmen sankarit, 1979
 Talvisodan ääniä, 1980
 Irina ja Mannerheim, 1981
 Simo Hurtta ja Anna, 1982
 Simo Hurtta ja Isoviha, 1983
 Aina Hangosta Petsamoon, 1984
 Sissiretki surman suuhun, 1985
 Isät katsovat poikiaan, 1985
 Toki kallehin on vapaus, 1986
 Lapin sissi, 1988
 Viimeiseen sissiin, 1992
 Raappanan miehet, 1996
 Korpisodan sankarit, 1998
 Kaukopartio, 2003

External links
 Article about Onni Palaste (in Finnish)

References

1917 births
2009 deaths
 People from Kiuruvesi
Writers from North Savo
 Finnish military personnel of World War II
 Recipients of the Iron Cross
20th-century Finnish novelists